Library science (often termed library studies or library and information science) is an interdisciplinary or multidisciplinary field that applies the practices, perspectives, and tools of management, information technology, education, and other areas to libraries; the collection, organization, preservation, and dissemination of information resources; and the political economy of information. Most professional library jobs require a professional post-baccalaureate degree in library science as a basic credential but this varies widely in different countries. There are also bachelor's, associate, and certificate programs in library science, which provide formal training of paraprofessional library workers, library technicians, and clerks—as well as preparation for graduate study in library science.

Australia
 Charles Sturt University, multi-campus
 Curtin University, Perth, Western Australia
Open Universities Australia, online
 RMIT University, Melbourne, Victoria
University of South Australia, Adelaide, South Australia

Bangladesh 

 East West University
 National University, Bangladesh
 Noakhali Science and Technology University
 University of Rajshahi
 University of Dhaka

Brazil
Alagoas, Federal University of
Amazonas, Federal University of
Bahia, Federal University of
Brasília, University of
Ceará, Federal University of
Espírito Santo, Federal University of
Minas Gerais, Federal University of
São Paulo, University of
State of Rio de Janeiro, Federal University of
Rio de Janeiro, University of

Canada
Alberta, University of
British Columbia, University of
Dalhousie University
McGill University
Montreal, University of
University of Ottawa
Toronto, University of
Western Ontario, University of

France
Ecole nationale supérieure des Sciences de l'Information et des Bibliothèques

Germany
Berlin School of Library and Information Science
Cologne University of Applied Sciences
Fachhochschule Potsdam
Hanover University of Applied Sciences
Hochschule der Medien
Leipzig University of Applied Sciences (Hochschule für Technik, Wirtschaft und Kultur/HTWK) 
Technische Hochschule Köln
University of Applied Sciences Hamburg

Hungary
Eötvös Loránd University

India
Aligarh Muslim University
Andhra University
Assam University
Babasaheb Bhimrao Ambedkar University
Banaras Hindu University
Bangalore University
Bundelkhand University
Delhi University
Dibrugarh University
Gauhati University
Goa University
Guru Ghasidas Vishwavidyalaya
Indian Statistical Institute (DRTC)
Indira Gandhi National Open University
Jadavpur University
Jiwaji University
Jodhpur National University
Mangalore University
Nirwan University Jaipur
Mizoram University
Netaji Subhas Open University
North Bengal University
North-Eastern Hill University
Pondicherry University
Rabindra Bharati University
SNDT Women's University
Tata Institute of Social Sciences
University of Burdwan
University of Calcutta
University of Kalyani
University of Madras
University of Mysore
Vidyasagar University
Central University of Gujarat

Iran
Al-Zahra University
Allameh Tabataba'i University
Ferdowsi University of Mashhad
Kharazmi University
Razi University
Shahed University
Shahid Beheshti University
Shahid Chamran University of Ahvaz
Shiraz University
Tarbiat Modares University
University of Isfahan
University of Tabriz
University of Tehran

Ireland
Dublin Business School
University College Dublin

Israel 
 Bar-Ilan University

Kenya 
 Moi University
 Mt. Kenya University
 Kenyatta University
 Technical University of Kenya
 Kisii University

Nigeria
Delta State University, Abraka
Abubakar Tafawa Balewa University
Ahmadu Bello University
Babcock University
University of Ibadan
University of Ilorin
University of Maiduguri
University of Nigeria, Nsukka
Nnamdi Azikiwe University
Tai Solarin University of Education
Federal University of Technology, Minna
Abia State University Uturu
Nnamdi Azikiwe University, Awka
Chukwuemeka Odumegwu Ojukwu University, Uli
Madonna University, Okija
Ambrose Alli University
Imo State University, Owerri
Lead City University, Ibadan
University of Benin
Kogi State University, Anyigba
Benson Idahosa University, Benin City
Taraba State University, Jalingo
Federal University, Dutsin-Ma, Katsina
Bayero University Kano
Federal University Dutse, Jigawa

Pakistan
University of the Punjab, Lahore
The Islamia University of Bahawalpur, Bahawalpur
University of Sargodha, Sargodha
University of Peshawar, Peshawar
University of Karachi, Karachi
University of Balochistan 
Allama Iqbal Open University, Islamabad

Peru
Pontifical Catholic University of Peru
National University of San Marcos

Portugal
University of Lisbon
University of Coimbra
University of Porto

Singapore
Nanyang Technological University

South Korea
Chung-Ang University
Ewha Womans University
Kyonggi University
Keimyung University
Yonsei University
Pusan University
Daejin University

South Africa 
 Cape Town, University of
 Durban University of Technology
 Fort Hare, University of
 Johannesburg, University of
 KwaZulu-Natal, University of
 Limpopo, University of
 Pretoria, University of
 South Africa, University of
 Walter Sisulu University
 Western Cape, University of
 Zululand, University of

Sri Lanka 
 University of Kelaniya

Sweden 
Borås, University of

United Kingdom
In the UK CILIP (the Chartered Institute of Library and Information Professionals) accredits university courses for professional acceptance. 
Aberystwyth University
Brighton, University of
Cranfield University
Glasgow, University of
King's College London
London, City University
Loughborough University
Manchester Metropolitan University
Northumbria University
Robert Gordon University
Sheffield, University of
Strathclyde, University of
Ulster University
University College London
West of England - Bristol, University of
Wrexham Glyndŵr University

United States

See also
 List of information schools

References

Library science education
Library science
Lists of universities and colleges
Lists of universities and colleges in the United States